The 10,000 metres speed skating event was part of the speed skating at the 1948 Winter Olympics programme. The competition was held on Tuesday,3 February 1948. Twenty-seven speed skaters from eleven nations competed.

Medalists

Records
These were the standing world and Olympic records (in minutes) prior to the 1948 Winter Olympics.

(*) The record was set on naturally frozen ice.

Results

References

External links
Official Olympic Report
 

Speed skating at the 1948 Winter Olympics